Majid Rashid Sultan Al-Khabeel Al-Mehrzi (Arabic:ماجد راشد) (born 16 May 2000) is an Emirati footballer. He currently plays as a midfielder for Al-Sharjah.

References

External links
 

Emirati footballers
2000 births
Living people
Al-Ittihad Kalba SC players
Sharjah FC players
Association football midfielders
UAE First Division League players
UAE Pro League players